Yech (majuscule: Ե; minuscule: ե; Armenian: եչ) is the fifth letter of the Armenian alphabet.  It is created by Mesrop Mashtots in the 5th century AD. It has a numerical value of 5. It represents the open-mid front unrounded vowel ([ɛ]), but when it occurs word-initially, it is pronounced as [jɛ].

Related characters and other similar characters
 Е е : Cyrillic letter Ye
 Є є : Cyrillic letter Ukrainian Ye
 E e : Latin letter E
 t : Latin letter T

See also
 Armenian alphabet
 Mesrop Mashtots

References

External links
 Ե on Wiktionary
 ե on Wiktionary

Armenian letters